Damn Yankees! is a 1967 American TV adaptation directed by Kirk Browning of the baseball musical Damn Yankees. 

Longtime sportscaster and NBC host Joe Garagiola  supplied an on-camera set-up to the background for the story’s premise of envy of the successful New York Yankees team.

The pop-art production design and staging featured collage animation and early examples of color Chroma key compositing to achieve traveling mattes for TV.

It was recorded at NBC's Brooklyn Studios and “colorcast“ on 8 April 1967 as a production of a relaunched ”G.E. Theater” which ran from late 60s into early 70s.

Cast
Lee Remick as Lola
Phil Silvers as Applegate
Jim Backus as Benny Van Buren
Fran Allison as Mrs. Meg Boyd
Jerry Lanning as Joe Hardy
Ray Middleton as Joe Boyd
Linda Lavin as Gloria Thorpe
Bob Dishy as Rocky

Note: All the principal cast were singers, so they could all supply their own vocals for the soundtrack without being dubbed.

References

External links
Damn Yankees at IMDb

1967 television films
1967 films
American television films
Films directed by Kirk Browning